Ian Sunter (born December 21, 1952) is a Scottish-Canadian Canadian football place kicker who also played two seasons in the NFL (1976 and 1980).

References

1952 births
Living people
American football placekickers
Canadian football placekickers
Canadian players of American football
Scottish players of American football
Cincinnati Bengals players
Detroit Lions players
Hamilton Tiger-Cats players
Toronto Argonauts players
Sportspeople from Dundee
Players of Canadian football from Ontario
Scottish emigrants to Canada